St. John de Britto Institute also referred to by its acronym ISIB or by its Portuguese name Instituto São João de Brito is a private Catholic coeducational higher education institution run by the Timor-Leste Region of the Society of Jesus in Kasait-Ulmera,  East Timor. It was established by the Jesuits in 2015 to train students to be secondary school teachers for the country. The school was named after St. John de Britto, a Portuguese Jesuit missionary and martyr.

History
After 2011 the Jesuits opened two of their own schools on a common campus near Kasait, not far from Dili: Colégio Santo Inácio de Loiolá and the teacher education Instituto São João de Brito. In 2017 ISIB operated out of classrooms of Loyola in Kasait as construction began there of its own facility. The original intake of ISIB was 25 students who would assist at Loyola College on the grounds in their first two years and in their third and fourth years would be supervised while teaching at various secondary schools throughout the country. It first offered majors in English and Religious Education but intends to extend offerings to mathematics, Portuguese, and Timorese History and Culture.

Collaborative effort 
The school cooperates with other Jesuit works in the country: a mission parish with secondary school and health care program in Railaco, a public service Audiovisual Production House, and Jesuit Social Service Timor-Leste which aims to foster volunteerism, strengthen communities, and facilitate networking.

Current situation
In 2018 it had 99 students and 16 lecturers. It offers a four-year program aimed at producing professional high school teachers. Fr. Sidelizio Ornai Pereira, SJ is the rector of the institute  2018.

See also
 List of Jesuit sites

References  

Universities in East Timor
Educational institutions established in 2016
Jesuit universities and colleges
Catholic Church in East Timor
2016 establishments in East Timor